Rawang is a state constituency in Selangor, Malaysia, that has been represented in the Selangor State Legislative Assembly since 1974.

The state constituency was created in the 1974 redistribution and is mandated to return a single member to the Selangor State Legislative Assembly under the first past the post voting system. , the State Assemblyman for Rawang is Chua Wei Kiat from the Parti Keadilan Rakyat (PKR), which is part of the state's ruling coalition, Pakatan Harapan (PH).

Demographics

History

Polling districts 
According to the federal gazette issued on 30 March 2018, the Rawang constituency is divided into 18 polling districts.

Representation history

Election results

References

Selangor state constituencies